Orlovo is a rural locality (a village) in Murom Urban Okrug, Vladimir Oblast, Russia. The population was 781 as of 2010. There are 4 streets.

Geography 
Orlovo is located 6 km southwest of Murom. Muromsky is the nearest rural locality.

References 

Rural localities in Murom Urban Okrug
Muromsky Uyezd